Air Vice-Marshal Peter James Murray Squires,  is a senior Royal Air Force officer, who currently serves as the Commander of British Forces Cyprus. From August 2016 to October 2019 he served as Commandant of RAF College Cranwell. He was formerly a Harrier pilot and served as commander of No. 100 Squadron RAF, flying BAE Systems Hawks.

Early life and education
From 1975 to 1986, Squires was educated at Warwick School, an all-boys public school in Warwick. Having received a bursary, he studied aeronautics and astronautics at the University of Southampton.

RAF career
On 1 October 1989, Squires was granted a short service commission in the General Duties Branch of the Royal Air Force (RAF). On 1 April 1990, he was promoted to flying officer, with seniority in that rank from 1 October 1988. He was promoted to flight lieutenant on 1 April 1992.

From April 2009 to April 2011, Squires commanded No. 100 Squadron RAF, a Hawk squadron is based at RAF Leeming. He was Commanding Officer of the 906 Expeditionary Air Wing during Operation Unified Protector, the NATO-enforced no-fly zone over Libya in 2011. He was promoted to group captain on 1 January 2012 and, in the 2012 New Year Honours, Squires was appointed an Officer of the Order of the British Empire.

It was announced in December 2015 that Squires would be the next Commandant of Royal Air Force College Cranwell. He then studied at Royal College of Defence Studies to prepare for the command. In August 2016, he succeeded Chris Luck as commandant and was made an Aide-de-Camp to The Queen. In October 2019 he left Cranwell to take up the post of Head Directorate Operational Capability in the Ministry of Defence.

Squires was promoted to Air Vice-Marshal on 1 September 2022, when he was appointed Commander of British Forces Cyprus and Administrator of the Sovereign Base Areas.

References

 

 
 
 

Living people
Royal Air Force officers
People educated at Warwick School
Graduates of the Royal College of Defence Studies
Alumni of the University of Southampton
Officers of the Order of the British Empire
Recipients of the Commendation for Valuable Service in the Air
Year of birth missing (living people)
Commandants of the Royal Air Force College Cranwell